James Clements (1927–2005)  was an American ornithologist, author and businessman.

James Clements may also refer to:

 James Clements Municipal Airport, Michigan, United States
 Jimmy Clements (1847–1927), Australian Aboriginal leader
 James P. Clements (born 1964), president of Clemson University

See also 
 James Clement (disambiguation)